Turva is a village in Viljandi Parish, Viljandi County, Estonia.

As of 2011 Census, the settlement's population was 28.

Turva village is the location of Peetri (Piitre) Manor. The Art Nouveau main building was built by Friedrich von Sivers, the owner of Heimtali Manor, in 1910–1912, according to the plans of architect Otto Wildau.

References

Villages in Viljandi County